The 1896 Purdue Boilermakers football team was an American football team that represented Purdue University during the 1896 Western Conference football season. The Boilermakers compiled a 4–2–1 record and outscored their opponents by a total of 122 to 60 in their first season under head coach Samuel M. Hammond. Alpha Jamison was the team captain.

Schedule

References

Purdue
Purdue Boilermakers football seasons
Purdue Boilermakers football